Hong Kong made its Paralympic Games début at the 1972 Summer Paralympics in Heidelberg, and has taken part in every subsequent edition of the Summer Paralympics. It has never participated in the Winter Paralympics.

The territory's first gold medals came in 1984, when Hong Kong won the women's 4 × 400 m Relay in categories 2-5 in athletics. Mui Y. L. also won an individual gold in the women's 1,500m, category 3; and Fung Yuet Wah took gold in the women's individual foil (categories 4-5) in wheelchair fencing. Table tennis was the source of all three gold medals won in 1992, as Hong Kong players won the women's team event in category 5, the men's team in category 4, and Kwong Kam Shing won the men's singles in category 5.

In 1996, it was the men's 4 × 100 m relay (T34) which yielded gold in athletics, accompanying four gold medals in men's wheelchair fencing events. Wheelchair fencing has provided gold medals for Hong Kong in every subsequent edition of the Summer Paralympics, as has athletics. Lai Wai Ling added a gold medal in table tennis (category 11) in 2000, whereas boccia provided two gold in 2004, and one in 2008. Hong Kong's most successful competitors, are Yu Chui Yee in wheelchair fencing, who won seven gold medals, and So Wa Wai in athletics, who won twelve medals, including six gold, three silver and three bronze.

Medals

Summer Paralympics

Winter Paralympics

Medals by Summer Sport

Medals by Winter Sport

Medalists

See also
 Hong Kong at the Olympics

References